CD5 is a cluster of differentiation expressed on the surface of T cells (various species) and in a subset of murine B cells known as B-1a. The expression of this receptor in human B cells has been a controversial topic and to date there is no consensus regarding the role of this receptor as a marker of human B cells. B-1 cells have limited diversity of their B-cell receptor due to their lack of the enzyme terminal deoxynucleotidyl transferase (TdT) and are potentially self-reactive.  CD5 serves to mitigate activating signals from the BCR so that the B-1 cells can only be activated by very strong stimuli (such as bacterial proteins) and not by normal tissue proteins. CD5 was used as a T-cell marker until monoclonal antibodies against CD3 were developed.

In humans, the gene is located on the long arm of chromosome 11. There is no confirmed ligand for CD5 but there is evidence that CD72, a C-type lectin, may be a ligand or that CD5 may be homophilic, binding CD5 on the surface of other cells. CD5 includes a scavenger receptor cysteine-rich protein domain.

T cells express higher levels of CD5 than B cells. CD5 is upregulated on T cells upon strong activation. In the thymus, there is a correlation with CD5 expression and strength of the interaction of the T cell towards self-peptides.

Immunohistochemistry
CD5 is a good immunohistochemical marker for T-cells, although not as sensitive as CD3. About 76% of T-cell neoplasms are reported to express CD5, and it is also found in chronic lymphocytic leukemia and mantle cell lymphoma (both being B cell malignancies), that do not express CD3. It is commonly lost in cutaneous T-cell lymphoma, and its absence can be used as an indicator of malignancy in this condition. The absence of CD5 in T cell acute lymphoblastic leukemia, while relatively rare, is associated with a poor prognosis.

References

Further reading

External links 
 
 

Clusters of differentiation